is a former Japanese football player.

Club career
Kumagai was born in Towada on October 23, 1975. After graduating from high school, he joined Kashima Antlers in 1994. Although he could hardly play in the match in 1990s, he played many matches as defensive midfielder from 2000. In 2000, the club won the champions all three major title in Japan; J1 League, J.League Cup and Emperor's Cup first time in J1 League history. The club also won the champions 2001 J1 League and 2002 J.League Cup. From 2003, his opportunity to play decreased and he moved to Vegalta Sendai in July 2004. He retired end of 2005 season.

National team career
In April 1995, Kumagai was selected Japan U-20 national team for 1995 World Youth Championship. He played full time in all four matches as defensive midfielder.

Club statistics

References

External links

Vegalta Sendai News Release

1975 births
Living people
People from Towada, Aomori
Association football people from Aomori Prefecture
Japanese footballers
Japan youth international footballers
J1 League players
J2 League players
Kashima Antlers players
Vegalta Sendai players
Association football midfielders